

John Ritto Penniman (1782–1841) was a painter in Boston, Massachusetts, United States. He created portraits, landscapes, and allegorical paintings, as well as designs for engravings, such as the official seal of the city of Boston in 1822. He also worked as an assistant to Gilbert Stuart. Penniman died in 1841 in Baltimore.

References

Further reading
 Carol Damon Andrews. John Ritto Penniman (1782–1841): An Ingenious New England Artist. Antiques 120, no.1, July 1981.
 Worcester Art Museum. Artist biography: John Ritto Penniman (1782–1841).

External links

 WorldCat. Penniman, John Ritto 1782-1841
 Flickr. Unquity House, Milton, MA, by John Penniman, ca. 1827, summer home of Thomas Hutchinson

1782 births
1841 deaths
18th-century American painters
18th-century American male artists
American male painters
19th-century American painters
19th-century American male artists
American portrait painters
Artists from Boston
19th century in Boston